Irmer is a surname of German origin. It has emerged from the Old German first name Irminher (erm[en]/irm[in] = "strong", "tall" + heri = "warhost", "army"). Outside of Germany the surname is most often found among German Americans and German Brazilians.

Notable people with the surname include:
 Georg Irmer (1853–1931), German archivist, consul and historian
 Hannes Irmer (born c. 1988), German player of American football
 Hans-Jürgen Irmer (born 1952), German politician
 Jean Carlos de Souza Irmer  (born 1994), Brazilian footballer
 Karl-Heinz Irmer (1903–1975), German field hockey player

References

German-language surnames